The Seven Heroes and Five Gallants is a 19th-century Chinese novel.

The Seven Heroes and Five Gallants may also refer to:
The Seven Heroes and Five Gallants (1972 TV series), a Taiwanese TV series produced by Taiwan Television
The Seven Heroes and Five Gallants (1976 TV series), a Hong Kong TV series produced by Rediffusion Television
The Seven Heroes and Five Gallants (1983 TV series), a Taiwanese TV series produced by Taiwan Television
The Seven Heroes and Five Gallants (1994 TV series), a Taiwanese TV series produced by Chinese Television System
The New Seven Heroes and Five Gallants (1986 TV series), a Taiwanese TV series
The New Seven Heroes and Five Gallants (1994 TV series), a mainland Chinese TV series

See also
 King Cat, a 1967 Hong Kong film also known as The Seven Heroes and Five Gallants
 Invincible Knights Errant, a 2011 Chinese TV series also known as The Seven Heroes and Five Gallants
The Three Heroes and Five Gallants (disambiguation)
Justice Bao (disambiguation)

The Seven Heroes and Five Gallants